Houston is a ghost town in York County, Nebraska, United States.

History
Houston was platted in 1887. It was named for Joseph D. Houston, a pioneer settler.  A post office was established at Houston in 1887, and remained in operation until it was discontinued in 1928.

References

Unincorporated communities in York County, Nebraska
Unincorporated communities in Nebraska